Rhyacionia pinivorana, the spotted shoot moth, is a moth of the family Tortricidae. It is found from northern and central Europe to eastern Russia, China, Korea and Japan.

The wingspan is 15–19 mm. The forewings are brownish-ferruginous, sometimes sprinkled with dark fuscous, costa and dorsum dark fuscous ; numerous irregular variable anastomosing shining grey-whitish striae. Hindwings grey. It is similar to Rhyacionia buoliana but darker and less reddish.

Adults are on wing in May and early June.

The larvae feed on Pinus sylvestris. The larvae attack the leading shoot.

References

External links
Eurasian Tortricidae

Eucosmini
Moths described in 1846
Moths of Japan
Moths of Europe